The B6 main road (locally referred as Limassol - Paphos old road, Greek "Παλαιός δρόμος Λεμεσού - Πάφου") used to be the main connecting route between Cyprus's second largest city and major seaport Limassol and Paphos, one of the island's top tourist destinations.

History
Since the island's capital was moved from Paphos to Nicosia after the Roman times, transportation to Paphos - being a very small town at the time - from the rest of the island was very difficult due to the mountainous geomorphology of the island's Southwestern coast. Until the British colonial times people also used the sea as an alternative to avoid the extremely long dangerous path connecting the two areas. In the end of 19th Century, near 1890, the first road was built. It was approximately 80 km long and between 10-12 feet wide. The B6 was built at 1963 and it runs along the same corridor of the first road. After the Turkish invasion in 1974, and the occupation of the touristic key city of Famagusta the government searched for alternatives to attract tourism to the rest of the island. The need of good road transportation to the whole island was one of the first projects to be done. The road is 66 km long (6 km longer than the A6 Motorway, a modern 4 lane highway that replaced the B6 as the main connecting route). It runs through 7 villages and the Western Sovereign Base Area.

Current status
After the completion of the A6 Motorway in 1996 the road is only used by locals, and rarely big traffic volumes occur. It is a very well maintained road and a very interesting drive. A small part of it after the village Pissouri is used by tourists as scenic route, having a bend right next to Petra Tou Romiou, the legendary Aphrodite's birthplace.

This road is currently closed to traffic from Pissouri to Aphrodites Rock due to instability of the land. It was closed in May 2019.
There are plans to fix and reopen the  road between Aphrodites Rock an Pissouri. Tenders finished at the end of November. Construction works are supposed to start end of January and will finish on June.

See also 
 B8 road (Cyprus)
 B20 road (Cyprus)

References 

Motorways and roads in Cyprus
Limited-access roads